Samarskoye (Hamar) is a rural locality (a village) in Tashtimerovsky Selsoviet, Abzelilovsky District, Bashkortostan, Russia. The population was 197 as of 2010. There are 5 streets.

Geography 
Samarskoye is located 29 km northeast of Askarovo (the district's administrative centre) by road. Aumyshevo is the nearest rural locality.

References 

Rural localities in Abzelilovsky District